Thomas Farmer may refer to:

Thomas Farmer (MP) (1546–1621), English MP for Norfolk
Thomas Farmer (composer) (fl. 1685), English composer
Tom Farmer (born 1940), Scottish entrepreneur
Tom Farmer (American football) (1921–1980), American football halfback
Thomas Fermore or Farmer (died 1609), MP for Chipping Wycombe
Thomas Fermor (died 1580), MP